The 1930 Tour of the Basque Country was the seventh edition of the Tour of the Basque Country cycle race and was held from 18 August to 21 August 1930. The race started in Bilbao and finished in Las Arenas. The race was won by Mariano Cañardo.

General classification

References

1930
Bas